Andronicus Contoblacas was a Greek Renaissance humanist and scholar. He was a lecturer at the University of Basel in Switzerland. He is noted for having been a teacher to Johann Reuchlin.

See also
Greek scholars in the Renaissance

References

Further reading
 Jonathan Harris, Greek Émigrés in the West, 1400-1520, Camberley UK: Porphyrogenitus, 1995. 
 John Monfasani, ‘In praise of Ognibene and blame of Guarino: Andronicus Contoblacas’s invective against Niccolò Botano and the citizens of Brescia’, Bibliothèque d’Humanisme et Renaissance 52 (1990), 309–21, reprinted in John Monfasani, Byzantine Scholars in Renaissance Italy: Cardinal Bessarion and other Emigres, Aldershot UK: Ashgate, 1995, no. XI
 W.O. Schmitt, `Eine unbekannte Rede zum Lob der Griechischen Sprache und Literatur - zur literarischen Biographie des Humanisten Andronikos Kontoblakes', Philologus 115 (1971), 264-77

15th-century Byzantine people
Greek Renaissance humanists
15th-century Greek educators